In mathematical optimization, fractional programming is a generalization of linear-fractional programming. The objective function in a fractional program is a ratio of two functions that are in general nonlinear. The ratio to be optimized often describes some kind of efficiency of a system.

Definition

Let  be real-valued functions defined on a set . Let . The nonlinear program

Concave fractional programs

A fractional program in which f is nonnegative and concave, g is positive and convex, and S is a convex set is called a concave fractional program. If g is affine, f does not have to be restricted in sign. The linear fractional program is a special case of a concave fractional program where all functions  are affine.

Properties

The function  is semistrictly quasiconcave on S. If f and g are differentiable, then q is pseudoconcave. In a linear fractional program, the objective function is pseudolinear.

Transformation to a concave program

By the transformation , any concave fractional program can be transformed to the equivalent parameter-free concave program

Duality

The Lagrangian dual of the equivalent concave program is

Notes

References

 
 

Optimization algorithms and methods